Free Stuff is a television program on the G4 network. "Featured products" ranging in value from $20.00 to $599.00 were previewed and then given away. Viewers entered to win the items by using their computer to submit codes which were shown to the viewers by Lloyd the Chimp during commercial breaks. The show aired throughout the month of June 2007 at 6:30 and 10:00 PM EDT/PDT and officially ended on June 29, 2007.

Free Stuff was hosted by Morgan Webb and Kevin Pereira.

External links 
 

G4 (American TV network) original programming
Interactive television
2007 American television series debuts
2007 American television series endings